XHFM-FM is a radio station in Veracruz, Veracruz, Mexico. It broadcasts on 94.9 FM.

History

XEFM-AM 1010 received its concession in 1963 and was originally owned by José L. Bravo. Despite this, it was part of the growing broadcast empire of Carlos Ferráez Matos, which also grew to include new television station XHFM-TV channel 2, one of the first affiliates of Televisión Independiente de México, in the decade. The station migrated to FM in the late 2000s. This callsign returns XHFM which also the first FM station in Mexico City than opened in 1952 and closed in 1957.

In March 31, 2022, it dropped its "One FM" format. A new permanent format, Spanish urban as "Fiesta 94-9", debuted on May 1, 2022.

References

Radio stations in Veracruz